Peru Senior High School is a public high school located in Peru, Clinton County, New York, U.S.A., and is the only high school operated by the Peru Central School District.

In July 2020, the school board voted to retire the Indians mascot, replacing it with the Nighthawks in 2021.

Athletics 
In 2001, the Peru High School football team was the class B New York State Champions.

Footnotes

Schools in Clinton County, New York
Public high schools in New York (state)